Wissam Kassem Tarif (born 10 April 1975) has played a key role in the field of pro-Democracy and Human Rights work in Syria and Lebanon, as both an intellectual and activist. Currently Director of an influential Middle East human rights organisation, he continues to advocate open democracy and works on both a regional and international level to this end, focusing on the situation in Syria, Iran and Saudi Arabia in particular.

The early years and South America
Born in Lebanon's picturesque Beka'a Valley city of Zahlé, (also transliterated Zahlah or Zahleh) Mr Tarif and his family come from the small mountain town of al-Karaoun on the banks of Lake Litani in the same region. Known in Lebanon for their courage when faced with the occupation of their town (notably, the family was the first to have their home blown up by the invading army), their reputation for independent thinking in a country constitutionally constructed on sectarian interests, is well-established.

"When, at 12 years old, my friend Jude was run over by a military tank, I was splattered by his flesh. I can still taste the burning skin whenever I remember it. It was something that changed my life, made me aware of the importance of being human, being a person," Tarif recalls.

Having grown up with the sounds, smells and tragedy of continuous conflict all his life, at the age of 13, Wissam Tarif was sent by his family to South America (Paraguay and Argentina), where he joined elder brothers who had been sent ahead of him. From a very early age, though, he assumed and adopted a strong sense of responsibility towards himself and others.

Back in Beirut and then Syria
Immersing himself in civil society institutions in Beirut, Mr Tarif started by working for Greenpeace where he began to get a feel for the region's concerns at grass roots level, making his initial appearance on the opinion and analysis pages of well-known and respected Middle East newspapers and magazines, such as An-Nahar. Coming, as he did, to the attention of numerous politicians and leading intellectuals in Lebanon (as was the case with the redoubtable Samir Kassir, with whom a warm friendship grew), Mr Tarif soon became an integral part of intellectual life in Beirut. Anxious, however, to continue contributing to democracy and human rights values in the region, he eventually moved to Damascus, Syria, where he founded a cultural centre.

Parallel to this, Mr Tarif became a prime mover of the Opposition forces in Syria, working closely with well-known artist, political dissident, prisoner of conscience and human rights leader Kamal Labwani, (sent to jail in Syria on a 15-year term for his advocacy of democracy) to found the Liberal Democratic Union. Tarif worked to support and promote the values of a movement known as the Damascus Spring, which blossomed following the coming to power of the new President of Syria, Bashaar al-Assad. The tightening of the Syrian regime's grip on power led to the imprisonment of the majority of voices claiming freedom and democracy.

Working for democracy
Since then, Wissam Tarif has led a continuous campaign for the democratisation of Syria, Lebanon and the Middle East. Appreciated for his in-depth political and strategic published analyses, he has made a reputation not only among the diplomatic and political communities in Lebanon and Syria, but amongst intellectuals, communicators and thinkers.

Interrogated 17 times by the Syrian security police during his time in Syria, there have been various attempts on his life. Undeterred, he continues to campaign as Director of the Middle East human rights organisation, the Foundation for the Defense of Prisoners of Conscience (FDPOC).

The Foundation for the Defense of Prisoners of Conscience (FDPOC) and INSAN
FDPOC (now superseded by the Europe-based NGO INSAN INSAN)worked in Syria, Iran and Saudi Arabia in particular. It received daily monitoring reports from grass roots activists within its countries of focus, in order to ensure that the rest of the world heard about the violations of human rights the authorities preferred to keep silent.

The organisation and its Board of Trustees were also active at an international level.

Wissam Tarif, however, argued for a wider, more global vision for the Organisation, as a result of which FDPOC took a strategic decision in 2009: to maintain its activists and workers in situ in the Middle East but to shift its centre of operations to the European Union in order to not only increase its operational effectiveness, but to ensure a framework of freedom which would better enable it to ensure human rights in the region were better and more immediately projected. The new organisation, under the name of 'INSAN' (www.insanintl.com) is a fully registered NGO with its headquarters in Spain. INSAN thus builds on the previous work done by FDPOC but, at the same time, expands upon it. INSAN's work, while focussing on human rights, also covers the broader fields of democracy and development issues across not only the Middle East but also throughout North Africa (MENA). It was in this wider context (and to facilitate its activist and campaigning work), that the Organisation's offices were transferred to Spain, which is strategically situated to service the logistic and campaigning needs of this already growing but well-established Organisation. This is especially the case with an eye to INSAN's centre of operations in the MENA region and to the closeness of influential EU institutions and politicians in Brussels.

Wissam Tarif is currently Executive Director of INSAN.

See also
Human rights in Lebanon
Human rights in Syria

References

External links
 

Lebanese democracy activists
1975 births
Living people